Chicago International Charter School (CICS) is a charter school with 14 campuses in Chicago, Illinois.  CICS has a student population composed of 96% ethnic minorities. Of the population, 66% are African American, 25% are Hispanic, 4% are Caucasian, 2% are Asian/Pacific Islander and 1% are multi-racial, with 86% coming from low income households.

Campuses 
 Avalon (K-8)
 Basil (K-8)
 Bucktown (K-8)
 ChicagoQuest (9–12)
 Irving Park (K-8)
 Lloyd Bond (K-6)
 Longwood (3–12)
 Loomis Primary (K-2)
 Northtown Academy (9–12)
 Prairie (K-8)
 Ralph Ellison (9–12)
 Washington Park (K-8)
 West Belden (K-8)
 Wrightwood (K-8)

References

External links
Chicago International Charter School

Charter schools in Chicago
Public elementary schools in Chicago
Public middle schools in Chicago
Public high schools in Chicago